One hundred and ninety-one Guggenheim Fellowships were awarded in 1952.

1952 U.S. and Canadian Fellows

1952 Latin American and Caribbean Fellows

See also
 Guggenheim Fellowship
 List of Guggenheim Fellowships awarded in 1951
 List of Guggenheim Fellowships awarded in 1953

References

1952
1952 awards